Salzweg is a municipality  in the district of Passau in Bavaria in Germany.  It is located near the German border with Austria.

References

Passau (district)